The Albuquerque Veterans Administration Medical Center, at 2100 Ridgecrest, SE, in Albuquerque, New Mexico, was built in 1932. It was listed on the National Register of Historic Places in 1983.

It was built in a combination of Spanish Revival architecture and Pueblo Revival architecture styles.

Its National Register nomination states:"Building 1 is asymetrical with box-like massing. It steps up in
terraces, varying in height from one to four stories. A five story
tower rises off-center of the main entrance, which consists of three
portals surrounded by roughly hewn lintels and columns. The ceiling of
the Main Lobby is finished in beautifully hand carved wood beams or
vigas that are decoratively painted revealing the Indian motifs. These
still remain. Building 2 features two rounded bell towers with battered
walls on either side of the entry, giving the structure a resemblance to
a pueblo church. Buildings 1, 2, 3, 4, and the quarters have pueblo and
Spanish details such as timber framed porches, decorated corbels and
lintel beams, vigas, patio gardens and pueblo style arcades, often
randomly placed at the upper levels (in the case of buildings 3 & 4).
Straight headed windows are set deep into the walls. The engineering
support buildings are plainer with less detailing but their scale,
massing, finish materials and minimal details are the same as the main
buildings."

It was listed in conformance with a 2011 study of veterans hospitals nationwide.

References

External links

Hospitals in New Mexico
United States Department of Veterans Affairs
Veterans Affairs medical facilities
National Register of Historic Places in Albuquerque, New Mexico
Buildings and structures completed in 1932
Pueblo Revival architecture in Albuquerque, New Mexico